Pyrausta borealis, the northern pyrausta moth, is a moth in the family Crambidae. It was described by Alpheus Spring Packard in 1867. It is found in North America, where it has been recorded from Newfoundland and Labrador west to British Columbia, north to Alaska and the Yukon. The habitat consists of boreal forests.

The wingspan is 14–18 mm. The ground color of the fore- and hindwings is fulvous brown with dull yellowish-buff postmedial and subterminal lines. Adults are on wing from mid-May to mid-July.

Taxonomy
The species was formerly treated as a subspecies of Pyrausta subsequalis.

References

Moths described in 1867
borealis
Moths of North America